The 2009 Formula BMW Pacific season was the eighth Formula BMW Pacific season. It began on May 2 in Sepang and ended on November 22 in Macau after 15 rounds in five countries. Rio Haryanto became champion with one race to spare, having won the title at Okayama.

Teams and drivers
 All cars are powered by BMW engines, and Mygale FB02 chassis. Guest drivers in italics.

Calendar

* At the last three rounds, guest drivers started from pole position, setting the fastest lap before winning the race. In Singapore, Felipe Nasr achieved that before Facundo Regalia (Okayama) and William Buller did so in Macau.

Standings
Points are awarded as follows:

Note: In the second race at the Sepang F1 support event, due to insufficient distance covered, half points were awarded.

References

External links
 BMW-Motorsport.com
 Asian Festival Of Speed

Formula BMW seasons
Formula BMW Pacific season
2009 in Asian sport
BMW Pacific